Charlie Swan may refer to:
Charlie Swan (horse trainer), Irish National Hunt trainer and former jockey
Charlie Swan (Twilight), a fictional character from the Twilight series by Stephenie Meyer

See also
Charles Swan (disambiguation)
Charlie (given name)